Juan González may refer to:

Sports

Association football
 Juan Carlos González (1924–2010), Uruguayan footballer
 Juan González Calderón (born 1975), Chilean footballer
 Juan Cruz González (born 1996), Argentine footballer
 Juan Diego González (born 1980), Colombian footballer
 Juan González (Colombian footballer) (born 1988), Colombian footballer
 Juan González-Vigil (born 1985), Peruvian footballer
 Juan González (Uruguayan footballer) (born 1972), retired Uruguayan football forward
 Juan Luis González (born 1974), Chilean football defender

Other sports
 El Hijo del Diablo (Juan Carlos Gonzales, born 1962), Mexican professional wrestler
 Juan González (baseball) (born 1969), former Major League Baseball player
 Juan González (cyclist) (born 1972), Andorran cyclist
 Juan González (handballer) (born 1974), Cuban handball player
 Juan González (judoka) (born 1967), Guatemalan judoka
 Juan González (volleyball) (born 1994), Spanish volleyball player

Other people
 Juan González (journalist) (born 1947), Puerto Rican journalist, a frequent co-host on Democracy Now!
 Juan Gonzalez (artist) (1942–1993), famous New York-based Cuban artist
 Juan de Marcos González (born 1954), Cuban bandleader
 Juan Pablo Gonzalez (born 1987), Botswana gymnast; see 2013 European Wrestling Championships – Men's Freestyle 55 kg
 Juan E. González, scientist and educator 
 Juan González de Mendoza (1545–1618), Spanish sinologist
 Juan Gualberto González (1851–1912), president of Paraguay, 1890–1894
 Juan Ignacio González del Castillo (1763–1800), Spanish playwright
 Juan Natalicio González (1897–1966), president of Paraguay, 1948
 Juan Picasso González (1857–1935), Spanish army officer

Other uses
 Juan González, Adjuntas, Puerto Rico, a barrio of Adjuntas, Puerto Rico

See also
 Joan Gonzàlez (born 2002), Spanish footballer